Maloye Gorodishche is a rural locality (a village) in Solikamsky District, Perm Krai, Russia. The population was 30 as of 2010. There is 1 street.

Geography 
Maloye Gorodishche is located 6 km northeast of Solikamsk (the district's administrative centre) by road. Gorodishche is the nearest rural locality.

References 

Rural localities in Solikamsky District